A warrant is generally an order that serves as a specific type of authorization, that is, a writ issued by a competent officer, usually a judge or magistrate, that permits an otherwise illegal act that would violate individual rights and affords the person executing the writ protection from damages if the act is performed.

A warrant is usually issued by a court and is directed to a sheriff, a constable, or a police officer. Warrants normally issued by a court include search warrants, arrest warrants, and execution warrants.

Types
 Arrest warrant, issued by a judge to detain someone
 Execution warrant, writ issued by a judge authorizing the death of someone
 Possessory warrant, a civil writ issued by a judge ordering property delivered to a named person
 Search warrant, a writ issued by a judge allowing law enforcement to look inside a property
 Warrant of committal, issued by a judge ordering enforcement of a previous order against an uncooperative person or corporation
 Warrant of delivery, a civil writ issued by a judge ordering property delivered to a named person
 Warrant of execution, a writ issued by a judge allowing law enforcement officers to seize property
 Warrant of possession, an Australian judge ordered to terminate of a residential real estate tenancy

United Kingdom
In the United Kingdom, senior public appointments are made by warrant under the royal sign-manual, the personal signature of the monarch, on the recommendation of the government. In an interesting survival from medieval times, these warrants abate (lose their force) on the death of the sovereign if they have not already been executed. This particularly applied to death warrants in the days when England authorized capital punishment.

Perhaps the most celebrated example of this occurred on 17 November 1558, when England was under the rule of a Catholic queen, Mary I, daughter of Henry VIII and the Spanish Catholic Catherine of Aragon. Several Protestant "heretics" had been condemned to die, a not uncommon situation under the reign of "Bloody Mary". They were tied to stakes in Smithfield, an open market area in central London, and the firewood bundles were about to be lit, when a royal messenger rode up to announce that Mary I had died: the warrants for their death had lost their force. The first formal act of Mary's successor, the Protestant Elizabeth I, daughter of Henry VIII and Anne Boleyn, was to decline to re-issue the warrants; the Protestants were released a few weeks later.

United States

History
For many years, the English, later British, government had used a "general warrant" to enforce its laws. These warrants were broad in nature and did not have specifics as to why they were issued or what the arrest was being made for. A general warrant placed almost no limitations on the search or arresting authority of a soldier or sheriff. This concept had become a serious problem when those in power issued general warrants to have their enemies arrested when no wrongdoing had been done. The Parliament of Great Britain passed the Revenue Act of 1767 which reaffirmed the legality of writs of assistance, or general search warrants, and gave customs officials broad powers to search houses and businesses for smuggled goods. This law was one of the key acts of Great Britain which led to the American Revolution, and is the direct reason that the American Founding Fathers ensured that general warrants would be illegal in the United States by ratifying the Fourth Amendment to the U.S. Constitution in 1791.

Practice
Under the Fourth Amendment to the United States Constitution a warrant is broadly required, which particularly describes the place to be searched, and the persons, or things, to be seized; no warrants may be issued without probable cause, and support by testimony before a judge.

The courts have recognized many warrantless searches, including exceptions for routine administrative or inventory searches, searches made under exigent circumstances, and searches made with consent.

A typical arrest warrant in the United States will take the approximate form of: "This Court orders the Sheriff or Constable to find the named person, wherever he may be found, and deliver said person to the custody of the Court."  Generally, a U.S. arrest warrant must contain the caption of the court issuing the warrant, the name (if known) of the person to be arrested, the offense charged, the date of issue, the officer(s) to whom the warrant is directed, and the signature of the magistrate.

Warrants may also be issued by other government entities, including legislatures, since most have the power to compel the attendance of their members.  When a legislature issues a warrant, it is called a call of the house.

The person being investigated, arrested, or having their property seized, pursuant to a warrant is given a copy of the warrant at the time of its execution.

See also
 Arrest Warrant of 11 April 2000 case, a case in public international law involving diplomatic immunity 
 Warrant canary, a method used by Internet service providers to inform their customers that the provider has been served with a secret government subpoena
 Quo warranto, a writ requiring the person to whom it is directed to show what authority they have for exercising some right or power (or "franchise") they claim to hold

References

External links

 UK appointments made by warrant under the Royal sign manual—from the London Gazette

Law enforcement terminology